The first of the 2009 Sumatra earthquakes occurred on 30 September off the coast of Sumatra, Indonesia with a moment magnitude of 7.6 at . Government and authorities confirmed 1,115 dead, 1,214 severely injured and 1,688 slightly injured. The most deaths occurred in the areas of Padang Pariaman (675), Padang (313), Agam (80) and Pariaman (37). In addition, around 135,000 houses were severely damaged, 65,000 houses were moderately damaged and 79,000 houses were slightly damaged. An estimated 250,000 families (1,250,000 people) have been affected by the earthquake through the total or partial loss of their homes and livelihoods.

Tectonic setting

Many of Indonesia's islands, including Sumatra, are situated within a zone of high seismic activity known as the Ring of Fire. Along the Sunda megathrust, the Indo-Australian Plate is being subducted beneath the Eurasian plate. The subduction creates regular earthquakes, many of them of megathrust type. Specifically the Sumatran segment is currently experiencing a period of increased activity that began with the catastrophic 2004 Indian Ocean earthquake. Each earthquake of the sequence adds additional stresses to segments of the plate boundary that have not moved recently.

Earthquakes 
Because of its depth and the computed focal mechanism, the first earthquake is thought to have resulted from deformation within the mantle of the descending Australian plate, rather than from movement on the plate boundary itself. Although it was in the same region, the United States Geological Survey specified that it was not an aftershock, as it was located too far from the initial quake. The second earthquake has been linked to dextral (right-lateral) movement on the Great Sumatran fault, which takes up the strike-slip component of the convergence between the two plates.

Effects
 
Tremors from the first earthquake were felt in the Indonesian capital, Jakarta, Malaysia and Singapore. The management of some high-rise buildings in Singapore evacuated their staff.

A tsunami watch was triggered and there was reports of house damage and fires. Hotels in Padang were destroyed, and communications to the city were disrupted.

Local news channel Metro TV reported fires in Padang where residents had run onto the streets as the first quake hit. Teams of rescuers from nearby branches of the National Search and Rescue Agency were deployed to Padang. It was also reported that some water pipes in Padang were broken and there was flooding in the street. There were reports that at least two hospitals and several schools collapsed.

There were landslides and collateral debris flows in the hills surrounding Lake Maninjau. The landslide in Gunung Nan Tigo, Padang Pariaman district completely destroyed some villages and caused many fatalities. Landslides also forced some roads to be closed.

Padang's Minangkabau International Airport suffered minor damage, with parts of the ceiling in the boarding area falling down. The airport reopened on 1 October.

Response

Authorities announced that several disaster management teams were en route to Padang although it took several hours for them to reach more remote areas. Rescue workers pulled dozens of survivors from the rubble and rushed them to Djamil Hospital. The hospital itself was overwhelmed with patients, and many patients were treated in tents set up outside the hospital. A man was trapped beneath a flattened hotel for 25 hours with a broken leg before rescue workers pulled him free. The Indonesian military deployed emergency response teams with earth moving equipment to help move rubble and recover trapped victims. Rescue workers and volunteers searched the rubble of a collapsed three-story concrete building, rescuing survivors and recovering bodies while parents of students trapped inside waited nearby. Indonesian villagers used their bare hands to sift through ruins and try to find survivors. On 5 October, Indonesian rescue workers called off their search for trapped survivors and increased efforts to recover bodies, clear rubble, and provide aid to survivors. Indonesian authorities used helicopters to airdrop food and blankets into remote areas, and to bring the wounded from these areas to hospitals.

World Vision, Oxfam, IFRC, Muslim Charity and Mercy Corps confirmed that they would fly their emergency response teams to the devastated Padang area for rapid assessment of the catastrophe. The Red Cross sought donations to help cover earthquake relief costs. World Vision also airlifted 2,000 collapsible water containers and distributed them immediately to the area most affected by earthquake. Additionally World Vision launched US$1 million appeal for the relief effort.

Countries that sent aid
Below is the table of countries that sent or pledged aid for Indonesia

See also
List of earthquakes in 2009
List of earthquakes in Indonesia

References

External links

 Rescue efforts continue in Indonesia – On Demand News
 Indonesia quake deaths pass 1,000 – BBC News
 

Earthquakes in Sumatra
2009 earthquakes
2009 in Indonesia
2009 tsunamis
2009 earthquakes
Earthquake clusters, swarms, and sequences
Earthquakes in Indonesia
September 2009 events in Asia
2009 earthquakes
Landslides in Indonesia
2009 disasters in Indonesia